Richard Dawson Busk (21 June 1895 – 24 December 1961) was an English cricketer, a right-handed batsman who bowled right-arm fast. Most of his cricket was played at Minor Counties level for Dorset between 1912 and 1939, but he also appeared in first-class cricket for Hampshire in 1919 and then occasionally for amateur sides in the 1920s.

While still a schoolboy at Marlborough College, Busk made his county cricket debut for Dorset in the Minor Counties Championship against Berkshire in 1912. He played nine times for Dorset up to the 1914 match against Berkshire, which turned out to be the final match of the season for Dorset, with all the side's cricket then cancelled owing to the beginning of the First World War.

After the First World War, Busk made his first-class debut for Hampshire against the touring Australian Imperial Forces cricket team in 1919. He played one County Championship match for Hampshire in the same season, against Surrey. Busk took two wickets at a bowling average of 62.50.

Busk played for the Marylebone Cricket Club in two first-class matches against the British Army and Scotland in 1920 and 1922. He made his highest first-class score of 43 against the Army and with the ball Busk took eight wickets in his two MCC matches at a bowling average of 28.62, with best figures of 4-60 against Scotland. In addition, he played for a West of England side in 1927 against the touring New Zealanders.

In 1920 Busk returned to playing for Dorset in the Minor Counties Championship, playing his return match against the Kent Second XI. Including his pre-war spell with Dorset, he represented the county in 129 Minor Counties matches, playing his final Minor Counties match for Dorset against Devon in 1939.

He died at Rampisham, Dorset on 24 December 1961.

External links
Richard Busk at Cricinfo
Richard Busk at CricketArchive

1895 births
1961 deaths
People from Marylebone
Cricketers from Greater London
English cricketers
Dorset cricketers
Hampshire cricketers
Marylebone Cricket Club cricketers
West of England cricketers